Vincent Clerc (born 7 May 1981) is a former French rugby union player who played on the wing.

Birth and early career
Born in the city of Échirolles, suburb of the south of Grenoble (Isère), Clerc first played rugby at FC Grenoble, helping them reach the Top 16 before moving to Toulouse in 2002, where he has played ever since. Clerc earned his first cap for France on November 9, 2002 against South Africa. Whilst at Toulouse Clerc won the Heineken Cup three times in 2003, 2005 and 2010. In the 2003 final he scored Toulouse's try as they defeated Perpignan.

2007 to 2010
Clerc was left out of the French squad for the 2006 Autumn Internationals, but was called up as a replacement for Cédric Heymans for the match against Ireland during the 2007 Six Nations Championship. In a closely contested match at Croke Park, Clerc scored a last-gasp try to snatch a 20–17 victory for France.

Clerc was picked for the 2007 Rugby World Cup.

He scored 5 tries during the first two games of the 2008 Six Nations Championship against Scotland and Ireland. In a post-match interview after the match against Ireland Clerc stated to the French TV channel France 2 that he "never would have been able to score a hat-trick if Shane Horgan had been playing." Horgan and Clerc have had a long rivalry and, unfortunately for Ireland, Horgan was unfit to play. In the 2007 RBS 6 Nations tournament Vincent scored a last gasp try against Ireland. In the last game of that series of games Vincent Clerc helped France to trounce Scotland to give them the title.

During the 2008 6 Nations, media attention focused on the final match of the tournament, where Clerc and Shane Williams would play as opposite numbers. Both had scored five tries so far in the tournament, but ultimately the match, dubbed as the "Big battle of the little people" was won by Wales, with Williams scoring one final try in the competition.

Clerc ruptured the ligaments in his left knee while playing for Stade Toulousain against ASM Clermont Auvergne in April 2008. He made his club comeback in December 2008, against Mont-de-Marsan, and was recalled to the national squad for the summer 2009 tests.

In 2010, he was selected in the French Barbarians squad to play Tonga on November 26.

2011 to present
Clerc was selected in the squad for the 2011 Rugby World Cup in New Zealand, and was one of the stars of the tournament. He played every game for France and posed a constant threat on the right wing. He scored six tries for the tournament, three of them against Canada, to finish the tournament as joint top try-scorer with England's Chris Ashton.

On November 17, 2012, against Argentina in Lille, Clerc scored two tries to take his overall international tally to 34 tries, overtaking Philippe Saint-André to become France's second highest try scorer. France won 39–22. Clerc said after the match: We got off to a bad start, which is a bad habit of ours. However, we fought back and turned it round after 15 minutes. We could have scored a few more tries but we will take this. Will I ever play again after passing Philippe's mark? I hope so but I will have to talk to him!

Life outside of rugby
Clerc is involved with the Toulouse-based charity Maison des Parents, which works alongside parents and their children, who suffer from illnesses and are being treated in Toulouse.

International tries

Honours

Toulouse
 Heineken Cup: 2002–03, 2004–05, 2009–10
 Top 14: 2007–08, 2010–11, 2011–12

France
 Six Nations Championship: 2004 (Grand Slam), 2007, 2010 (Grand Slam)

References

External links 

  
 
 

1981 births
Living people
People from Échirolles
French rugby union players
Stade Toulousain players
Rugby union wings
France international rugby union players
Sportspeople from Isère
Sportspeople from Grenoble